Satu Mare County is a county (județ) of Romania, on the border with Hungary and Ukraine. The capital city is Satu Mare.

Name
In Hungarian, it is known as Szatmár megye, in German as Kreis Sathmar, in Ukrainian as Сату-Маре, and in Slovak as Satmárska župa.

Demographics

Satu Mare is a multicultural city, with a population mix of Romanian, Hungarian, Roma, German, and other ethnicities.

 Romanians – 58.8%
 Hungarians – 35.2%
 Roma – 3.7%
 Germans (Sathmar Swabians) – 1.7%
 Ukrainians, Slovaks, other

 Romanians – 57.73%
 Hungarians – 34.5%
 Roma – 5.32%
 Germans (Sathmar Swabians) – 1.51%
 Rusyns, Ukrainians, Slovaks, other

Hungarians mostly reside along the border with Hungary, but some are also scattered throughout the whole county. Historically, Hungarians were concentrated in the cities, where administration resides, while the Romanian population was larger in the villages throughout the county. In 1930, the Hungarians represented 41.9% of the urban population in Satu Mare County and only 20.0% of the population in the villages according to census data.
The proportion of different ethnic groups varied throughout history, due to regime and political changes. After the Austro-Hungarian Compromise of 1867, the Hungarian population increased its proportion greatly, in 1880 representing 44.4% and in 1910 reaching 55.1% of the county population, according to Árpád E. Varga. After World War I the Hungarian and German population declined.

Geography

In the north are the Oaș Mountains, part of the Eastern Carpathians. This makes up around 17% of the area. The remainder is hills, forming 20% of the area, and plains. The western part of the county takes up the Eastern part of the Pannonian Plain.

The county is crossed by the Someș River, the Tur River, and Crasna River.

The county lies partly in the historical region of Maramureș and partly in the historical region of Crișana.

Neighbours

Maramureș County in the East.
Hungary in the West – Szabolcs-Szatmár-Bereg County.
Ukraine in the North – Zakarpattia Oblast.
Bihor County and Sălaj County in the South.

Satu Mare County, together with the Bihor, Bistrița-Năsăud, Cluj, Maramureș, and Sălaj counties, constitute the Nord-Vest development region of Romania. The county is a member of the Carpathian Euroregion.

Economy
Satu Mare County benefits from its position, close to the border of Romania with Hungary and Ukraine, and it is one of the places which attracts foreign investment in industry and agriculture.

The predominant industries in the county are:
 Textiles industry;
 Machine and automotive components;
 Food industry;
 Wood and furniture industry.

Tourism
The main tourist attractions in the county are:
 The "Oaș Country", with its strong Romanian folk traditions, on the North Eastern side of the county;
 The Oaș Mountains;
 The cities of Satu Mare and Carei;
 Tășnad Resort;
 The fortifications from Ardud and Medieșu Aurit.

Politics 

The Satu Mare County Council, renewed at the 2020 local elections, consists of 32 counsellors, with the following party composition:

Administrative divisions

Satu Mare County has 2 municipalities, 4 towns, and 59 communes:

Municipalities
Satu Mare – county seat; 102,441 (as of 2011)
Carei
Towns
Ardud
Livada
Negrești-Oaș
Tășnad

Communes
Acâș
Agriș
Andrid
Apa
Bătarci
Beltiug
Berveni
Bixad
Bârsău
Bogdand
Botiz
Călinești-Oaș
Cămărzana
Cămin
Căpleni
Căuaș
Cehal
Certeze
Ciumești
Craidorolț
Crucișor
Culciu
Doba
Dorolț
Foieni
Gherța Mică
Halmeu
Hodod
Homoroade
Lazuri
Medieșu Aurit
Micula
Moftin
Odoreu
Orașu Nou
Păulești
Petrești
Pir
Pișcolt
Pomi
Porumbești
Racşa
Sanislău
Santău
Săcășeni
Săuca
Socond
Supur
Tarna Mare
Terebești
Tiream
Târșolț
Turț
Turulung
Urziceni
Valea Vinului
Vetiș
Viile Satu Mare
Vama

Historical county

Historically, the county was located in the northwestern part of Greater Romania, stretching to its borders with Czechoslovakia and Hungary. Its territory lay in the historical Crișana region. After the administrative unification law in 1925, the name of the county remained as it was, but the territory was reorganized. It was bordered on the northwest by Hungary, on the north by Czechoslovakia, to the east by Maramureș County, to the southeast by Someș County, and to the south and southwest by Sălaj County. Currently, its territory is included in the current counties of Satu Mare and Maramureș.

Administration

In 1930, the county was divided into eight districts (plăși):

Plasa Arded (headquartered at Arded)
Plasa Baia Mare (headquartered at Baia Mare)
Plasa Mănăștur (headquartered at Mănăștur)
Plasa Oașiu (headquartered at Oașiu)
Plasa Satu Mare (headquartered at Satu Mare)
Plasa Seini (headquartered at Seini)
Plasa Șomcuta Mare (headquartered at Șomcuta Mare)
Plasa Ugocea (headquartered at Ugocea)

The county included the city of Satu Mare (the county seat) and the urban communes Baia Mare and Baia Sprie.

History
Prior to World War I, the territory of the county belonged to Austria-Hungary and mostly was contained in the Szatmár County of the Kingdom of Hungary. In the aftermath of the war and the ensuing Hungarian–Romanian War, the Romanian Army entered the county in early 1919, and its administration passed to the Kingdom of Romania. The territory of Satu Mare County was transferred to Romania from Hungary as successor state to Austria-Hungary in June 1920 under the Treaty of Trianon.

In 1938, King Carol II promulgated a new Constitution, and subsequently he had the administrative division of the Romanian territory changed. 10 ținuturi (approximate translation: "lands") were created (by merging the counties) to be ruled by rezidenți regali (approximate translation: "Royal Residents") - appointed directly by the King - instead of the prefects. Satu Mare County became part of Ținutul Crișuri.

At the end of August 1940, the county was transferred back to Hungary with the rest of Northern Transylvania under the Second Vienna Award. In October 1944, Romanian forces with Soviet assistance recaptured the ceded territory, with the Battle of Carei marking the complete reintegration of Northern Transylvania into Romania. Romanian jurisdiction over the county per the Treaty of Trianon was reaffirmed in the Paris Peace Treaties, 1947. The county was disestablished by the communist government of Romania in 1950, and its territory became part of Baia Mare Region, which in turn was renamed the Maramureș Region in 1960. Satu Mare County was re-established in 1968,  when Romania restored the county administrative system.

Population 
According to the 1930 census data, the county population was 294,875, 60.5% Romanians, 25.2% Hungarians, 8.1% Jews, 3.2% Germans, as well as other minorities. From a religious point of view, the population consisted of 59.0% Greek Catholics, 15.0% Roman Catholics, 8.6% Jewish, 4.4% Eastern Orthodox, as well as other minorities.

Urban population 
In 1930, the county's urban population was 69,526 inhabitants, 41.9% Hungarians, 35.0% Romanians, 18.6% Jews, 1.6% Germans, as well as other minorities. As a mother tongue in the urban area, Hungarian dominated (55.6%), followed by Romanian (31.1%), Yiddish (10.6%), German (1.4%), as well as other minorities. From the religious point of view, the urban population consisted of 33.7% Greek Catholics, 23.0% Reformed, 20.0% Jewish, 19.6% Roman Catholic, 2.9% Eastern Orthodox, as well as other minorities.

See also
 Satmar (Hasidic dynasty), a Jewish religious group named after this place
 Szatmár County of the Kingdom of Hungary

References

External links

 
Counties of Romania
Hungarian communities in Romania
1925 establishments in Romania
1938 disestablishments in Romania
1944 establishments in Romania
1950 disestablishments in Romania
1968 establishments in Romania
States and territories established in 1925
States and territories disestablished in 1938
States and territories established in 1944
States and territories disestablished in 1950
States and territories established in 1968